Beirut Municipal Stadium is an 18,000 capacity multi-purpose stadium in Beirut, Lebanon. It is currently mostly used for football matches.

History
The stadium was built by the French colonials in 1935. DPHB played at the inaugural game of the stadium, with players such as Camille Cordahi and Joseph Nalbandian.

References 

Football venues in Beirut
Rugby league stadiums in Lebanon
Buildings and structures in Beirut
Sport in Beirut
Multi-purpose stadiums in Lebanon
Sports venues completed in 1935